Assales Fatumaca is a school in Baucau District, near Gariuai, East Timor.

History
Missionaries first came to Fatumaca in order to open schools for East Timorese youth, and requested permission of the Gariuai king, and asked for land upon which to build a school. The king granted his permission. There was only one school at first, the ETP (Escola Tecnica Proffecional); Assales Fatumaca was a subsequent school.

Educational System
The Assales Fatumaca educational system is based on the Don Bosco "preventive system", which assumes that preventing someone from making a mistake is better than punishing them after they make a mistake, which makes Assales Fatumaca stricter than ETP Fatumaca; Assales Fatumaca also has an elimination program for those who fall below the marks level set by the school. Assales Fatumaca has a full marching band.

ETP and Assales Fatumaca are rivals, and play against one another in three cups: Immaculada Cup (8 Dec), Don Bosco Cup (31 Jan), and the Auxiliadora Cup (24 May).

Schools in East Timor
Baucau Municipality
Salesians of Don Bosco